The Unicode Standard assigns various properties to each Unicode character and code point. 

The properties can be used to handle characters (code points) in processes, like in line-breaking, script direction right-to-left or applying controls. Some "character properties" are also defined for code points that have no character assigned and code points that are labeled like "<not a character>". The character properties are described in Standard Annex #44.

Properties have levels of forcefulness: normative, informative, contributory, or provisional. For simplicity of specification, a character property can be assigned by specifying a continuous range of code points that have the same property.

Semantic elements
Properties are displayed  in the following order:

 [code];[name];[gc];[cc];[bc];[decomposition];;;[nv];[bm];[alias];;;;

'alias' = corrected name
'bc' = bidi (bidirectional) category [L, R etc]
'bm' = bidi mirrored [N or Y]
'cc' = combining class [position of diacritic]
decomposition = letter + diacritic, ligature X Y, superscript X, font X, initial X, medial X, final X, isolated X, vertical X, etc.
'gc' = general category [letter, symbol, digit, punctuation, case behavior, etc.]
'nv' = numeric value [of a digit]

Name
A Unicode character is assigned a unique Name (na). The name is composed of uppercase letters A–Z, digits 0–9, hyphen-minus (-) and space. Some sequences are excluded: names beginning with a space or hyphen, names ending with a space or hyphen, repeated spaces or hyphens, and space after hyphen are not allowed. The name is guaranteed to be unique within Unicode, and can be used to identify a code point and its character. Ideographic characters, of which there are tens of thousands, are named in the pattern "-hhhh". For example, . Formatting characters are named too: .

The following classes of code point do not have a Name (na=""): Controls (General Category: Cc), Private use (Co), Surrogate (Cs), Non-characters (Cn) and Reserved (Cn). They may be referenced, informally, by a generic or specific meta-name, called "Code Point Labels": . Since these labels contain <>-brackets, they can never appear as a Name, which prevents confusion.

Version 1.0 names
In version 2.0 of Unicode, many names were changed. From then on the rule "a name will never change" came into effect, including the strict (normative) use of alias names. Disused version 1.0-names were moved to the property Alias, to provide some backward compatibility.

Character name alias

Starting from Unicode version 2.0, the published name for a code point will never change. Therefore, in the event of a character name being misspelled or if the character name is completely wrong or seriously misleading, a formal Character Name Alias may be assigned to the character, and this alias may be used by applications instead of the actual defective character name. For example,  has the character name alias "PRESENTATION FORM FOR VERTICAL RIGHT WHITE LENTICULAR BRACKET" in order to mitigate the misspelling of "bracket" as "brakcet" in the actual character name;  has the character name alias "YI SYLLABLE ITERATION MARK" because contrary to the character name it does not have a fixed syllabic value.

In addition to character name aliases which are corrections to defective character names, some characters are assigned aliases which are alternative names or abbreviations. Five types of character name aliases are defined in the Unicode Standard:
 Correction: corrections for misspelled or seriously incorrect character names;
 Control: ISO 6429 names for C0 and C1 control functions (which are not assigned character names in the Unicode Standard);
 Alternate: alternative names for some format characters (only U+FEFF "ZERO WIDTH NO-BREAK SPACE" which has the alias "BYTE ORDER MARK");
 Figment: Documented labels for some C1 control code functions which are not actual names in any standard;
 Abbreviation: Abbreviations or acronyms for control codes, format characters, spaces, and variation selectors.

All formal character name aliases follow the rules for permissible character names, and are guaranteed to be unique within both the character name alias and the character name namespaces (for this reason, the ISO 6429 name "BELL" is not defined as an alias for U+0007 because U+1F514 is named "BELL").

As of Unicode version 12.1, twenty-eight formal character name aliases are defined as corrections for defective character names. These are listed below.

Apart from these normative names, informal names may be shown in the Unicode code charts. These are other commonly used names for a character, and do not have the same character restriction. These informal names are not guaranteed to be unique, and may be changed or removed in later versions of the standard.

General Category
Each code point is assigned a value for General Category. This is one of the character properties that are also defined for unassigned code points and code points that are defined "not a character".

Punctuation
Characters have separate properties to denote they are a punctuation character. The properties all have a Yes/No values: Dash, Quotation_Mark, Sentence_Terminal, Terminal_Punctuation.

Whitespace

Whitespace is a commonly used concept for a typographic effect. Basically it covers invisible characters that have a spacing effect in rendered text. It includes spaces, tabs, and new line formatting controls. In Unicode, such a character has the property set "WSpace=yes". In version 15.0, there are 25 whitespace characters.

Other general characteristics
Ideographic, alphabetic, noncharacter.

Combining class
Some common codes:
0 = spacing letter, symbol or modifier (e.g. a, (ʰ)
1 = overlay
6 = Han reading (CJK diacritic reading marks)
7 = nukta (diacritic nukta in Brahmic scripts)
8 = kana voicing marks
9 = virama

10–199 = various fixed-position classes

Marks which attach to the base letter:
200 = attached at bottom left
202 = attached directly below (e.g. cedilla on ç)
204 = attached at bottom right
208 = attached to left
210 = attached to right
212 = attached to top left
214 = attached directly above
216 = attached at top right

Marks which do not attach to the base letter:
218 = bottom left
220 = directly below (e.g. ring on n̥)
222 = below right
224 = left
226 = right
228 = above left
230 = above (e.g. acute accent on á)
232 = above right
233 = double below (subtends two bases)
234 = double above (extends two bases)
240 = iota subscript (only that Greek diacritic)

Display-related properties
Shaping, width.

Bidirectional writing
Six character properties pertain to bi-directional writing: Bidi_Class, Bidi_Control, Bidi_Mirrored, Bidi_Mirroring_Glyph, Bidi_Paired_Bracket and Bidi_Paired_Bracket_Type.

One of Unicode's major features is support of bi-directional (Bidi) text display right-to-left (R-to-L) and left-to-right (L-to-R). The Unicode Bidirectional Algorithm UAX9 describes the process of presenting text with altering script directions. For example, it enables a Hebrew quote in an English text. The Bidi_Character_Type marks a character's behaviour in directional writing. To override a direction, Unicode has defined special formatting control characters (Bidi-Controls). These characters can enforce a direction, and by definition only affect bi-directional writing.

Each code point has a property called Bidi_Class. It defines its behaviour in a bidirectional text as interpreted by the algorithm:

In normal situations, the algorithm can determine the direction of a text by this character property. To control more complex Bidi situations, e.g. when an English text has a Hebrew quote, extra options are added to Unicode. Twelve characters have the property Bidi_Control=Yes: ALM, FSI, LRE, LRI, LRM, LRO, PDF, PDI, RLE, RLI, RLM and RLO as named in the table. These are invisible formatting control characters, only used by the algorithm and with no effect outside of bidirectional formatting. Despite the name, they are formatting characters, not control characters, and have General category "Other, format (Cf)" in the Unicode definition.

Basically, the algorithm determines a sequence of characters with the same strong direction type (R-to-L or L-to-R), taking in account an overruling by the special Bidi-controls. Number strings (Weak types) are assigned a direction according to their strong environment, as are Neutral characters. Finally, the characters are displayed per a string's direction.

Two character properties are relevant to determining a mirror image of a glyph in bidirectional text: Bidi_Mirrored=Yes indicates that the glyph should be mirrored when written R-to-L. The property Bidi_Mirroring_Glyph=U+hhhh can then point to the mirrored character. For example, brackets "()" are mirrored this way. Shaping cursive scripts such as Arabic, and mirroring glyphs that have a direction, is not part of the algorithm.

Casing
The Case value is Normative in Unicode. It pertains to those scripts with uppercase (aka capital, majuscule) and the lowercase (aka small, minuscule) letters. Case-difference occurs in Adlam, Armenian, Cherokee, Coptic, Cyrillic, Deseret, Glagolitic, Greek, Khutsuri and Mkhedruli Georgian, Latin, Medefaidrin, Old Hungarian, Osage, Vithkuqi and Warang Citi scripts.

(upper, lower, title, folding—both simple and full)

Numeric values and types

Decimal
Characters are classified with a Numeric type. Characters such as fractions, subscripts, superscripts, Roman numerals, currency numerators, encircled numbers, and script-specific digits are type Numeric. They have a numeric value that can be decimal, including zero and negatives, or a vulgar fraction. If there is not such a value, as with most of the characters, the numeric type is "None".

The characters that do have a numeric value are separated in three groups: Decimal (De), Digit (Di) and Numeric (Nu, i.e. all other). "Decimal" means the character is a straight decimal digit. Only characters that are part of a contiguous encoded range 0..9 have numeric type Decimal. Other digits, like superscripts, have numeric type Digit. All numeric characters like fractions and Roman numerals end up with the type "Numeric". The intended effect is that a simple parser can use these decimal numeric values, without being distracted by say a numeric superscript or a fraction. Seventy-three CJK Ideographs that represent a number, including those used for accounting, are typed Numeric.

On the other hand, characters that could have a numeric value as a second meaning are still marked Numeric type "None", and have no numeric value (""). E.g. Latin letters can be used in paragraph numbering like "II.A.1.b", but the letters "I", "A" and "b" are not numeric (type
"None") and have no numeric value.

Hexadecimal digits
Hexadecimal characters are those in the series with hexadecimal values 0...9ABCDEF (sixteen characters, decimal value 0–15). The character property Hex_Digit is set to Yes when a character is in such a series:

Forty-four characters are marked as Hex_Digit.  The ones in the Basic Latin block are also marked as ASCII_Hex_Digit.

Unicode has no separate characters for hexadecimal values. A consequence is, that when using regular characters it is not possible to determine whether hexadecimal value is intended, or even whether a value is intended at all. That should be determined at a higher level, e.g. by prepending "0x" to a hexadecimal number or by context. The only feature is that Unicode can note that a sequence can or can not be a hexadecimal value.

Block

A block is a uniquely named, contiguous range of code points. It is identified by its first and last code point. Blocks do not overlap. A block may contain code points that are reserved, not-assigned, etc. Each character that is assigned, has a single "block name" value from the 327 names assigned as of Unicode version 15.0. Unassigned code points outside of an existing block have the default value "No_block".

Script

Each assigned character can have a single value for its "Script" property, signifying to which script it belongs. The value is a four-letter code in the range Aaaa-Zzzz, as available in ISO 15924, which is mapped to a writing system. Apart from when describing the background and usage of a script, Unicode does not use a connection between a script and languages that use that script. So "Hebrew" refers to the Hebrew script, not to the Hebrew language.

The special code Zyyy for "Common" allows a single value for a character that is used in multiple scripts. The code Zinh "Inherited script", used for combining characters and certain other special-purpose code points, indicates that a character "inherits" its script identity from the character with which it is combined. (Unicode formerly used the private code Qaai for this purpose.) The code Zzzz "Unknown" is used for all characters that do not belong to a script (i.e. the default value), such as symbols and formatting characters. Overall, characters of a single script can be scattered over multiple blocks, like Latin characters. And the other way around too: multiple scripts can be present is a single block, e.g. block Letterlike Symbols contains characters from the Latin, Greek and Common scripts.

When the Script is "" (blank), according to Unicode the character does not belong to a script. This pertains to symbols, because the existing ISO script codes "Zmth" (Mathematical notation), "Zsym" (Symbol), and "Zsye" (Symbol, emoji variant) are not used in Unicode. The "Script" property is also blank for code points that are not a typographic character like controls, substitutes, and private use code points.

Normalization properties
Decompositions, decomposition type, canonical combining class, composition exclusions, and more.

Age
Age is the version of the Standard in which the code point was first designated. The version number is shortened to the numbering major.minor, although there more detailed version numbers are used: versions 4.0.0 and 4.0.1 both are named 4.0 as Age. Given the releases, Age can be from the range: 1.1, 2.0, 2.1, 3.0, 3.1, 3.2, 4.0, 4.1, 5.0, 5.1, 5.2, 6.0, 6.1, 6.2, 6.3, 7.0, 8.0, 9.0, 10.0, 11.0, 12.0, 12.1, 13.0, 14.0 and 15.0. The long values for Age begin in a V and use an underscore instead of a dot: V1_1, for example. Codepoints without a specifically assigned age value have the value "NA", with the long form "Unassigned".

Deprecated
Once a character has been defined, it will not be removed or reassigned. However, a character may be deprecated, meaning its "use is strongly discouraged". As of Unicode version 15.0, the following fifteen characters are deprecated:

Boundaries
The Unicode Standard specifies the following boundary-related properties:
 Grapheme cluster
 Word
 Line
 Sentence

Alias name
Unicode can assign alias names to code points. These names are unique over all names (including regular ones), so they can be usedas identifier. There are five possible reasons to add an alias:

1. Abbreviation
Commonly occurring abbreviations or acronyms for control codes, format characters, spaces, and variation selectors.
For example,  has alias . Sometimes presented in a box: .
2. Control
ISO 6429 names for C0 and C1 control functions and similar commonly occurring names, are added as an alias to the character.
For example,  has alias .
3. Correction
This is a correction for a "serious problem" in the primary character name, usually an error.
For example,  is actually a lowercase p, and so is given alias name : "actually this has the form of a lowercase calligraphic p, despite its name, and through the alias the correct spelling is added." In descriptions, with preceding symbol ※.
4. Alternate
A widely used alternate name for a character.
Example:  has alternate .
5. Figment
Several documented labels for C1 control code points which were never actually approved in any standard (figment = feigned, in fiction).
For example,  has figment alias . This name is an architectural concept from early drafts of ISO/IEC 10646-1, but it was never approved and standardized.

External links
Unicode Character Database, annex #44, explaining the different properties 
UnicodeData.txt – a list of all Unicode characters, with their properties

References

Character Properties